Cleisostoma is a genus of orchids with approximately 90 accepted species widely distributed through much of the Indian Subcontinent, Southeast Asia, China, New Guinea, and some of the islands of the Western Pacific.

The orchid abbreviation is Cleis.

Selected species

 Cleisostoma appendiculatum
 Cleisostoma arietinum
 Cleisostoma aspersum
 Cleisostoma bicorne
 Cleisostome chantaburiense
 Cleisostoma crassifolium
 Cleisostoma crochetii
 Cleisostoma dichroanthum
 Cleisostoma discolor
 Cleisostoma filiforme
 Cleisostoma halophilum
 Cleisostoma longi-folius
 Cleisostoma lowii
 Cleisostoma pachyfolium
 Cleisostoma pachyphyllus
 Cleisostoma pallidus
 Cleisostoma paniculatum
 Cleisostoma parishii
 Cleisostoma pendulata
 Cleisostoma racemiferum
 Cleisostoma ramosum
 Cleisostoma recurvum
 Cleisostoma rolfeanum
 Cleisostoma rostratum
 Cleisostoma sagittatum
 Cleisostoma sagittiforme
 Cleisostoma simondii
 Cleisostoma strongyloides
 Cleisostoma subulatum
 Cleisostoma tenuifolium
 Cleisostoma teretifolium
 Cleisostoma termissus
 Cleisostoma tridentatus
 Cleisostoma uraiensis
 Cleisostoma williamsoni

References

External links

 
Vandeae genera